Colin S. Smith (born April 27, 1958, in Edinburgh, Scotland) is a United States evangelical pastor and author.  Smith is currently the senior pastor of The Orchard Evangelical Free Church in Illinois, where he has been since 1996.  The Orchard Evangelical Free Church has Seven campus locations: Arlington Heights, Barrington, Itasca, Marengo, Chicago, Northfield and Vernon Hills.

Biography 
Smith was born in Edinburgh, Scotland, to George and Violet Smith. He came to faith in Christ and later sensed God's calling to pastoral ministry.  He attended the London School of Theology where he obtained a Bachelor of Arts in Theology and a Master of Philosophy.  During this time he was also an active member of the Fellowship of Independent Evangelical Churches, where he served as its president.  From 1980 to 1996, he served as senior pastor of Enfield Evangelical Free Church located in Enfield, UK.  In 1996, Smith became the senior pastor of The Orchard Evangelical Free Church and currently holds the longest tenure as senior pastor in that church's history.

Smith met his wife, Karen, at the London School of Theology.  They have two sons, Andrew and David.

Ministry 
In addition to being the senior pastor of The Orchard, Smith is also a respected author and has a nationally broadcast radio program, Unlocking the Bible, which is produced by Moody Bible Institute.  He is a council member of The Gospel Coalition and he has been a frequent speaker at Moody Bible for Founder's Week and has also made several appearances on the Total Living Network (TLN).

Selected publications
Unlocking the Bible, an evangelistic teaching package consisting of books, audio books, study guides, and video teachings
10 Keys for Unlocking the Bible (2002) 
Unlock the Bible in 30 Days (2004) 
10 Keys to Unlock the Christian Life (2005) 
The 10 Greatest Struggles of Your Life (2006) 
Jonah: Navigating a God-Centered Life (2012) 
The One Year Unlocking the Bible Devotional (2012)  
Heaven, How I Got Here: The Story of the thief on the Cross (2015) 
Momentum: Pursuing God's Blessings Through the Beatitudes (2016)

External links
  Smith's biography from The Orchard Evangelical Free Church.
  Smith's biography from Unlocking the Bible.
  Smith's personal blog from the Unlocking the Bible website.
  Smith's biography from Moody Publishers.
  Smith's biography from OnePlace.

American Christian theologians
1958 births
Living people
Alumni of the London School of Theology